India is a federal union comprising 28 states and 8 union territories, with a total of 36 entities. The states and union territories are further subdivided into districts and smaller administrative divisions.

History

Pre-independence 

The Indian subcontinent has been ruled by many different ethnic groups throughout its history, each instituting their own policies of administrative division in the region. The British Raj mostly retained the administrative structure of the preceding Mughal Empire. India was divided into provinces (also called Presidencies), directly governed by the British, and princely states, which were nominally controlled by a local prince or raja loyal to the British Empire, which held de facto sovereignty (suzerainty) over the princely states.

1947–1950 

Between 1947 and 1950 the territories of the princely states were politically integrated into the Indian union. Most were merged into existing provinces; others were organised into new provinces, such as Rajasthan, Himachal Pradesh, Madhya Bharat, and Vindhya Pradesh, made up of multiple princely states; a few, including Mysore, Hyderabad, Bhopal, and Bilaspur, became separate provinces. The new Constitution of India, which came into force on 26 January 1950, made India a sovereign democratic republic. The new republic was also declared to be a "Union of States". The constitution of 1950 distinguished between three main types of states:
 Part A states, which were the former governors' provinces of British India, were ruled by an elected governor and state legislature. The nine Part A states were:
 Assam (formerly Assam Province), 
 Bihar (formerly Bihar Province), 
 Bombay (formerly Bombay Province), 
 East Punjab (formerly Punjab Province), 
 Madhya Pradesh (formerly the Central Provinces and Berar), 
 Madras (formerly Madras Province), 
 Orissa (formerly Orissa Province), 
 Uttar Pradesh (formerly the United Provinces), and
 West Bengal (formerly Bengal Province).
 The eight Part B states were former princely states or groups of princely states, governed by a rajpramukh, who was usually the ruler of a constituent state, and an elected legislature. The rajpramukh was appointed by the President of India. The Part B states were:
 Hyderabad (formerly Hyderabad Princely State), 
 Jammu and Kashmir (formerly Jammu and Kashmir Princely State), 
 Madhya Bharat (formerly Central India Agency), 
 Mysore (formerly Mysore Princely State), 
 Patiala and East Punjab States Union (PEPSU),
 Rajasthan (formerly Rajputana Agency),
 Saurashtra (formerly Baroda, Western India and Gujarat States Agency), and 
 Travancore–Cochin (formerly Travancore Princely State and Cochin Princely State).
 The ten Part C states included both the former chief commissioners' provinces and some princely states, and each was governed by a chief commissioner appointed by the President of India. The Part C states were: 
 Ajmer (formerly Ajmer-Merwara Province), 
 Bhopal (formerly Bhopal Princely State),
Bilaspur (formerly Bilaspur Princely State),
 Coorg State (formerly Coorg Province), 
 Delhi, 
 Himachal Pradesh, 
 Kutch (formerly Cutch Princely State), 
 Manipur (formerly Manipur Princely State), 
 Tripura (formerly Tripura Princely State), and 
 Vindhya Pradesh (formerly Central India Agency).
 The only Part D state was the Andaman and Nicobar Islands, which were administered by a lieutenant governor appointed by the union government.

States reorganisation (1951–1956) 

Andhra State was created on 1 October 1953 from the Telugu-speaking northern districts of Madras State.

The French enclave of Chandernagore was transferred to West Bengal in 1954. In the same year Pondicherry, comprising the former French enclaves of Pondichéry, Karikal, Yanaon and Mahé, was transferred to India; this became a union territory in 1962.

Also in 1954, pro-India forces liberated the Portuguese-held enclaves of Dadrá and Nagar Aveli, declaring the short-lived de facto state of Free Dadra and Nagar Haveli. In 1961, India annexed it as the Union Territory of Dadra and Nagar Haveli.

The States Reorganisation Act, 1956 reorganised the states based on linguistic lines resulting in the creation of the new states.

As a result of this act:
 Madras State retained its name, with Kanyakumari district added to form Travancore–Cochin. 
 Andhra Pradesh was created with the merger of Andhra State with the Telugu-speaking districts of Hyderabad State in 1956. 
 Kerala was created by merging Malabar district and the Kasaragod taluk of South Canara districts of Madras State with Travancore–Cochin. 
 Mysore State was re-organized with the addition of the districts of Bellary and South Canara (excluding Kasaragod taluk) and the Kollegal taluk of Coimbatore district from the Madras State, the districts of Belgaum, Bijapur, North Canara and Dharwad from Bombay State, the Kannada-majority districts of Bidar, Raichur and Kalaburagi from Hyderabad State and the Coorg State. 
 The Laccadive Islands, Aminidivi Islands and Minicoy Island, which had been divided between the South Canara and Malabar districts of Madras State, were united and organised into the union territory of Lakshadweep.
 Bombay State was enlarged by the addition of Saurashtra State and Kutch State, the Marathi-speaking districts of Nagpur division of Madhya Pradesh and the Marathwada region of Hyderabad State. 
 Rajasthan and Punjab gained territories from Ajmer State and Patiala and East Punjab States Union respectively and certain territories of Bihar were transferred to West Bengal.

Post-1956 

Bombay State was split into the linguistic states of Gujarat and Maharashtra on 1 May 1960 by the Bombay Reorganisation Act. The former Union Territory of Nagaland achieved statehood on 1 December 1963. The Punjab Reorganisation Act, 1966 resulted in the creation of Haryana on 1 November and the transfer of the northern districts of Punjab to Himachal Pradesh. The act also designated Chandigarh as a union territory and the shared capital of Punjab and Haryana.

Madras State was renamed Tamil Nadu in 1969. The north-eastern states of Manipur, Meghalaya and Tripura were formed on 21 January 1972. Mysore State was renamed Karnataka in 1973. On 16 May 1975, Sikkim became the 22nd state of the Indian Union and the state's monarchy was abolished. In 1987, Arunachal Pradesh and Mizoram became states on 20 February, followed by Goa on 30 May, while erstwhile union territory of Goa, Daman and Diu's northern exclaves Damão and Diu became a separate union territory as Daman and Diu.

In November 2000, three new states were created, namely: 
 Chhattisgarh, from eastern Madhya Pradesh, 
 Uttaranchal, from northwest Uttar Pradesh (renamed Uttarakhand in 2007), and
 Jharkhand, from southern districts of Bihar with the enforcement of Madhya Pradesh Reorganisation Act, 2000, Uttar Pradesh Reorganisation Act, 2000 and Bihar Reorganisation Act, 2000 respectively.

Pondicherry was renamed Puducherry in 2007 and Orissa was renamed Odisha in 2011. Telangana was created on 2 June 2014 from ten former districts of north-western Andhra Pradesh.

In August 2019, the Parliament of India passed the Jammu and Kashmir Reorganisation Act, 2019, which contains provisions to reorganise the state of Jammu and Kashmir into two union territories; Jammu and Kashmir and Ladakh, effective from 31 October 2019. Later that year in November, the Government of India introduced legislation to merge the union territories of Daman and Diu and Dadra and Nagar Haveli into a single union territory to be known as Dadra and Nagar Haveli and Daman and Diu, effective from 26 January 2020.

Current proposals

States and Union territories

States

Union territories

Former states and union territories

Former states

Former union territories

Responsibilities and authorities 

The Constitution of India distributes the sovereign executive and legislative powers exercisable with respect to the territory of any State between the Union and that State.

See also 
 Administrative divisions of India
 Autonomous administrative divisions of India
 List of adjectives and demonyms for states and territories of India
 List of Indian state and union territory name etymologies
 List of princely states of British India (alphabetical)
 List of states and union territories of India by area
 List of states and union territories of India by population
 List of states in India by past population
 List of states of India by wildlife population
 Proposed states and union territories of India

References

External links 
 Official Government of India website: States and Union Territories

 
States and terrtories
India 1
States, India